Paquetville is an unincorporated community in Gloucester County, New Brunswick, Canada. It held village status prior to 2023. It is on the Acadian Peninsula at the intersection of Route 340, Route 135 and Route 350.

History

Paquetville was founded by Monseigneur Paquet in 1873, who brought several parishioners with him from Shippagan.

On 1 January 2023, Paquetville amalgamated with the village of Saint-Isidore and all or part of six local service districts to form the new town of Hautes-Terres. The community's name remains in official use.

Demographics

Language

Notable people

The village is the home of Édith Butler, who sings the song Paquetville.

See also
List of communities in New Brunswick

References

Communities in Gloucester County, New Brunswick
Former villages in New Brunswick